This is a list of notable crowd collapses and crushes. Many such accidents are also in the list of accidents and disasters by death toll. (The term "stampede" is often misused in popular media since it refers specifically to panicked flight from danger. Most of these events were crowd crushes, caused by poor event management.) The deadliest human crush of all time, with an estimated 10,000 deaths, was alleged to have occurred during the First Jewish–Roman War in AD 66. The deadliest modern incidents both belong to Saudi Arabia during the annual Hajj pilgrimage, with the 1990 Mecca tunnel tragedy claiming 1,426 lives and the 2015 Mina stampede claiming 2,400.

Before the 18th century 
In AD 80, the Roman-Jewish historian Josephus recorded that in AD 66, near the beginning of the First Jewish–Roman War, a Roman soldier mooned Jewish pilgrims at the Jewish Temple in Jerusalem who had gathered for Passover, and "spake such words as you might expect upon such a posture", causing a riot in which youths threw stones at the soldiers, who then called in reinforcements. The pilgrims panicked, and the ensuing stampede reportedly resulted in the deaths of ten thousand Jews.

18th century
 11 October 1711: 245 people were killed in a crush on the Guillotière bridge in Lyon, France, when a large crowd returning from a festival on the other side of the Rhône became trapped against an obstruction in the middle of the bridge caused by a collision between a carriage and a cart.
 30 May 1770: At least 133 people died when a fireworks display at what is now the Place de la Concorde in Paris, a celebration of the wedding of the future Louis XVI and Marie Antoinette, set mannequins and other decorations aflame, leading to a panic in which many were trampled and others drowned in the adjacent Seine. Some historians have put the total death toll up to 3,000.

19th century

20th century

21st century

2000s

2010s

2020s

References 

Human stampedes and crushes